The Board of Pharmacy Specialties (BPS) was established in 1976 and is an independent division of the American Pharmacists Association that grants recognition within the United States to appropriate pharmacy practice specialities and establishes standards for certification of pharmacists in 14 specialities. The specialty examinations are accredited by National Commission for Certifying Agencies (NCCA), the accreditation body of Institute for Credentialing Excellence (ICE).

The Executive Director of the BPS is William M. Ellis.

Specialties 
The BPS recognizes 14 specialties:
 Ambulatory Care (BCACP) established in 2009
 Cardiology (BCCP) established in 2017 
 Compounded Sterile Preparations (BCSCP) established in 2018
 Critical Care (BCCCP) established in 2013
 Emergency Medicine established in 2020
 Geriatric (BCGP) established in 2017 under BPS and in 1997 under Commission for Certification in Geriatric Pharmacy
 Infectious Diseases (BCIDP) established in 2017
 Nuclear (BCNP) established in 1978
 Nutrition Support (BCNSP) established in 1988
 Oncology (BCOP) established in 1996
 Pediatric (BCPPS) established in 2013
 Pharmacotherapy (BCPS) established in 1988
 Psychiatric (BCPP) established in 1994
 Solid Organ Transplantation (BCTXP) established in 2018

See also
 Board of Pharmacy

References

Pharmacy organizations in the United States
Pharmacy-related professional associations
Organizations established in 1976
Organizations based in Washington, D.C.